De-Thuk is a Tibetan cuisine soup that includes yak or sheep soup stock along with rice, different types of Tibetan cheeses and droma, a type of Tibetan root. The rice is cooked with much water or stock to reach a consistency similar to Cantonese rice congee.

See also

 List of soups
 List of Tibetan dishes

References

Tibetan soups